Saspochey is a village in the Leh district of Ladakh, India. It is located in the Likir tehsil. One of the early period temples with paintings that may be dated to late 12th century is located here. The paintings are in a very bad state of preservation, with only two walls and a small portion of the remaining two walls having surviving paintings.

Wooden sculptures (possibly dating before 12th century CE) are also stored inside this temple.

Demographics
According to the 2011 census of India, Saspochey has 36 households. The effective literacy rate (i.e. the literacy rate of population excluding children aged 6 and below) is 75%.

Art Works 
Paintings and Sculptures inside the temple at Saspochey.

References 

Villages in Likir tehsil